Rowing at the 2018 Asian Games was held at the JSC Lake, Palembang, Indonesia from August 19 to 24, 2018.

Schedule

Medalists

Men

Women

Medal table

Participating nations
A total of 259 athletes from 23 nations competed in rowing at the 2018 Asian Games:

References

External links
Rowing at the 2018 Asian Games
ARF results page
Official Result Book – Rowing

 
2018
2018 Asian Games events
2018 Asian Games
Asian Games